NGC 1350 is a spiral galaxy located 87 million light years away in the southern constellation Fornax (the Furnace).

Characteristics 
It measures roughly 130,000 light years across: slightly larger than our own galaxy, the Milky Way. It is classified as an Sa(r) galaxy, meaning that it is a spiral with arms wound tightly enough to form a prominent central ring. The faint outer ring (called a "pseudo-ring") is sometimes added to the beginning of the classification with the designation "R'1." NGC 1350 is seen on the outskirts of the Fornax cluster of galaxies, but its membership is uncertain due to distance. As of Dec 2008 there were no objects of note found in this galaxy.

Image
The image on the right is an almost-true color composite image made with the VLT's 8.2 meter Kueyen telescope on 26 Jan 2000, at the European Southern Observatory site at Cerro Paranal, Chile. Observations were done at the following wavelengths (and assigned the following colors): B (blue) for 6 minutes, V (green) for 4 minutes, R (orange) for 3 minutes, and I (red) for 3 minutes. The image covers a region of 8.0 x 5.0 arcminutes of sky. North is to the left and East is down.

The viewing angle and the two rings make NGC 1350 look somewhat like a cosmic "eye." Another feature is the tenuous nature of the outer arms, through which a number of background galaxies can be seen.  The outer region's blue tint indicates the presence of star formation.

References

External links
 

Fornax (constellation)
Spiral galaxies
1350
013059